The Minnesota Daily is the campus newspaper of the University of Minnesota, published Monday and Thursday while school is in session, and published weekly on Wednesdays during summer sessions. Published since 1900, the paper is currently the largest student-run and student-written newspaper in the United States and the largest paper in the state of Minnesota behind the Minneapolis Star Tribune and the St. Paul Pioneer Press. The Daily was named best daily college newspaper in the United States in 2009 and 2010 by the Society of Professional Journalists. The paper is independent from the University, but receives $500,000 worth of student service fees funding.

The Daily has a distribution of 12,150 copies per day (Monday and Thursday during the school year) and 10,000 copies per day (Wednesdays during summer) – available at over 200 locations on and near campus free of charge, as it is largely funded by advertising.  A typical edition has about a dozen pages. The Daily also provides readers with several special issues, including voters guides, housing guides, survival guides (published the first day of school), "Best of" inserts via the Grapevine Awards Fair (recognizing local businesses) and even parody issues – distributed during finals weeks.

The Minnesota Daily is entirely student-run and student-written, employing more than 150 students with the guidance of a general manager and the governance of its board of directors. The newspaper dually operates as a training institution, providing students with real work experience in journalism, photography, editing, advertising sales, marketing, finance, graphic design, editorial and advertising production, human resources, information systems, public relations, survey research and web programming. In addition, many students gain leadership and delegation skills in the Dailys many management positions.

In May 2010, the Society of Professional Journalists named the Minnesota Daily the best all-around daily student newspaper in the country for the second year in a row.

History
Starting in 1877, the student newspaper/magazine at the University of Minnesota was called the Ariel. In 1899, another local newspaper called Football was started by Horace Bagley, Mike Luby and Clarence Miller.  Unlike the Ariel, it was published daily. In response, the publishers of the Ariel decided to become a daily paper as well, giving birth to the Minnesota Daily.

There have been a number of notable individuals to work at the paper, including former NAACP leader Roy Wilkins, longtime CBS correspondent Harry Reasoner, radio personality Garrison Keillor and musician Bob Dylan.

The Minnesota Daily was the first college newspaper to provide access to its coverage via the Internet in 1990. The Daily website publishes each day's stories in addition to exclusive web videos, photo slideshows, and additional features.

In 2001, the popular "A&E" section of the Daily was suddenly shut down by student managers of the paper, which generated much criticism among readers and Daily alumni. Garrison Keillor, who had written for the section while a student at the university, said the choice to shutter the section "is not a decision that journalists would have made, and it diminishes the prestige of the paper." The section was quickly reestablished.

Awards
The Minnesota Daily: Awards & Recognitions

Sports Illustrated
  2013 - Top 25 under 25

Society of Professional Journalists:
  2010 – Best All-Around Daily Student Newspaper (1st place)
  2009 – Best All-Around Daily Student Newspaper (1st place)
  2005 – Best All-Around Daily Student Newspaper (2nd place)
  14 Marks of Excellence

Associated College Press:
  2011 – Pacemaker Winner (Four-year Daily Newspaper)
  2009 – Pacemaker Winner (Four-year Daily Newspaper)
  2008 – Pacemaker Finalist (Four-year Daily Newspaper)
  2007 – Pacemaker Finalist (Four-year Daily Newspaper)
  2005 – Best of the Midwest
  2005 – All-American Rating
  2005 – First Place (four-year college broadsheet)
  2005 – Best Arts & Entertainment Section
2007 ACP Newspaper Pacemaker Finalists
Second place diversity story of the year – Kathryn Nelson
First place feature photo – Tyler McKean
First place newspaper page one – Anna Berken
Second place illustration – Anna Berken and Miranda Moos
2008 ACP Newspaper Pacemaker Finalists
First place online package – Emma Carew
Second place sports story of the year – Jake Grovum
Third place general news photo – Matt Mead
First place spot news photo – Matt Mead
Second place spot news photo – Matt Mead
2009 ACP Newspaper Pacemaker Winners
First place feature photo – Paul Bangasser
First place spot news photo – Steve Maturen
Second place illustration – Karina Holtz
Honorable mention newspage/spread – *Ashley Goetz
Honorable mention illustration – *Ashley Goetz
Honorable mention newspaper page one – *Ashley Goetz/Karina Holtz

CNBAM:
  2005 – Best in Category: Media Kit
  2005 – First Place (classified group promotion – Housing Guide)
  2008 – First Place Promotional Campaign, Circulation 40k+ (2008 Grapevine Awards)
  2008 – Designer of the Year
  2009 – Second Place Best Rate Card/Media Kit
  2009 – First Place Best Newspaper Marketing Promotion Plan
  2009 – Third Place Best Sales Incentive Plan
  2009 – Second Place Best Electronic Banner Ad / House

Notable alumni
Chris Ison- Pulitzer Prize–winning journalist for the Star Tribune. Worked as an editor at the Minnesota Daily and is currently a faculty member at the SJMC. Often regales stories of his time at the Daily as he teaches. 
Alan Bjerga, 2010 president of the National Press Club
Brian J. Coyle, an American community leader, elected official, and gay activist and  writer for the Minnesota Daily in the 1960s
Keith Maurice Ellison, an American lawyer, politician, and a Democratic member of Congress. While a law student in 1989 and 1990, Ellison wrote several columns as Keith E. Hakim in the Minnesota Daily
Dick Guindon,  American cartoonist best known for his gag panel, Guindon, and cartoonist at the Minnesota Daily
Robert E. Hillard founder of the public relations agency Fleishman-Hillard in St. Louis, Missouri and editor-in-chief of the Minnesota Daily from 1938–39
James Lileks, an American journalist, columnist, and blogger and columnist at the Minnesota Daily who wrote under the pen name "James r. Lileks"
Maud Hart Lovelace, American author best known for the Betsy-Tacy series and former employee of the Minnesota Daily
Jack Ohman, an American editorial cartoonist and employee for the Daily
 Joe Roche, Iraq War veteran and political commentator who wrote a column for the Daily in the 1990s
Steve Sack, an American cartoonist who draws the cartoon activity panel Doodles. His editorial cartoons for the Minneapolis Star Tribune won a Pulitzer Prize in 2013.  He illustrated features and drew editorial cartoons at the Minnesota Daily
Eric Sevareid, a CBS journalist who was denied the editor-in-chief spot at the Minnesota Daily by university administration following a controversial column in 1934
Hugh Smith, news anchor at WTVT in Tampa, Florida from 1963 to 1991 and editor-in-chief of the Minnesota Daily during the 1955–56 academic year.
Ka Vang, Hmong playwright, fiction writer and poet and reporter at the Daily
William Wade,  American war correspondent during World War II and copy desk chief at the Minnesota Daily from 1936–1939
Roy Wilkins, a prominent civil rights activist in the United States from the 1930s to the 1970s and the first black journalist at the Minnesota Daily

See also
City Pages
MinnPost.com
St. Paul Pioneer Press
Star Tribune
 List of newspapers published in Minnesota

References

External links
 

Student newspapers published in Minnesota
University of Minnesota
Newspapers published in Minneapolis–Saint Paul, Minnesota
1900 establishments in Minnesota
Newspapers established in 1900